Bedadi is a village in south-western Ethiopia.

The Central Statistical Agency has not published an estimate for its 2005 population.

Populated places in the Oromia Region